There were 40 female and 111 male athletes representing the country at the 2000 Summer Paralympics.

Medal table

See also 
Japan at the 2000 Summer Olympics
Japan at the Paralympics

References

Bibliography

External links
International Paralympic Committee

Nations at the 2000 Summer Paralympics
Paralympics
2000